Karin Betty Kristina Malmberg (née Schotte), born 3 May 1958 in Spånga, Stockholm, is a Swedish politician from Ödeshög in Östergötland County. She also works an agronomist.

Betty Malmberg was elected during the 2006 general election, and sat as a regular member from 2006 to 2010. From 2010 to 2013, she was a deputy in the Riksdag, and in 2013 became a regular member again. She is currently taking up the number 10 seat in the Riksdag for of Östergötland's constituency. She has been a member of the education committee from 2006 to 2018 and she even was the president of the committee for a short time in 2013. She is currently serving in the Environment and Agriculture committee. She is also a member of the Swedish UNESCO Council.

References

Notes

1958 births
Living people
Members of the Riksdag from the Moderate Party
Women members of the Riksdag
21st-century Swedish women politicians
Members of the Riksdag 2018–2022